We Have A Dream: Global Summit Against Discrimination and Persecution was an international summit organized by the Geneva-based non-governmental organization UN Watch, and attended by an international collection of non-governmental organizations to discuss issues of discrimination and persecution, particularly those of racism, sexism, homophobia, and discrimination against minorities. It occurred over two days, September 21 and 22 of 2011, across the street from a United Nations conference referred to as Durban III.

The summit was created in response to the United Nations' inclusion of countries that commit particularly atrocious human rights abuses, especially in the Human Rights Council, such as China, Syria, Sudan, Zimbabwe, North Korea, and Iran. This claim has been supported by the Human Rights Foundation, a partner of the summit, whose President, Thor Halvorssen, refers to Durban III as “the last act in a tragicomedy” that underscores the UN's complacency with “despotic regimes which speak pretty words about human rights while they kill, torture, or jail their opponents”.

Speakers

Burma
 Thaung Htun: Activist

Canada
 Irwin Cotler: Member of Canadian Parliament

China
 Geng He: Dissident, wife of human rights lawyer Gao Zhisheng
 Yang Jianli: Dissident

Cuba
 Fidel Suarez Cruz: Dissident
 Bertha Antunez: Women's rights activist

Darfur
 Adeeb Yousif: Activist

Democratic Republic of the Congo
 Judith Registre: Women for Women International

France
 Anna-Isabelle Tollet: Journalist and author
 Phillipe Robinet: Publisher, co-founder of Oh! Editions

Iran
 Banafsheh Zand-Bonazzi: Activist
 Marina Nemat: Author, Former prisoner
 Ahmad Batebi: Dissident

North Korea
 Ma Young Ae: Defector, former intelligence officer

Rwanda
 Bertha Kayitesi: Genocide survivor

South Sudan
 Luka Biong Deng: Director of KUSH, former minister
 John Dau: Genocide survivor, human rights activist

Syria
 Nasser Weddady: Civil Rights Outreach Director, AIC
 Rami Nakleh: Dissident

Tibet
 Ngawang Sandral: Activist

Uganda
 Jacqueline Kasha: LGBT activist

United States
 David Keyes: Co-founder of Cyber Dissidents
 Maran Turner: Director of Freedom Now
 Joel Brinkley: Journalist

Uyghur
 Rebiya Kadeer: Activist, former prisoner

Vietnam
 Thuy Tran: Activist and writer

Zimbabwe
 Grace Kwinje: Dissident and journalist

References

External links
 Official website
 Speech by Yang Jianli

Human rights
2011 conferences
Criticism of the United Nations